Shane Stanley (born June 15, 1971 in Encino, Los Angeles) is a filmmaker and founder of Visual Arts Entertainment, a film and television production company based in Los Angeles. He is best known for producing Gridiron Gang starring Dwayne "The Rock" Johnson for Sony Pictures and directing Bret Michaels's music videos. Stanley won a production Emmy Award at sixteen, and a second at nineteen for his work on The Desperate Passage Series. He made his directorial debut helming his own screenplay A Sight for Sore Eyes.

Books

Stanley wrote What You Don't Learn in Film School which released Jan 30, 2018 and co-wrote Bret Michaels's autobiography Roses & Thorns for Simon & Schuster. His father Lee's autobiography, Faith in the Land of Make-Believe, is based on the family and their years dealing with juvenile inmates in Los Angeles County, a cause to which Lee dedicated over twenty-five years. Stanley was also mentioned in Sweet Demotion, the autobiography by world renown music journalist, Lonn Friend founder of RIP magazine.

Awards and honors

In 1988 Shane, along with Lee Stanley, Gary Milton, David Fixx, and Carl Himmelman won Emmy Awards for their camera work on Desperate Passage which starred Michael Landon. The show was a recipient of four Emmy Award nominations and won two, making Shane the youngest to have won the award in any non-actor category. He was sixteen at the time.

In 1990, Stanley was again nominated for an Emmy Award along with Lee Stanley and Gary Milton for their camera work on Maiden Voyage starring Sharon Gless.

In 1991, Stanley was nominated for two Emmy Awards in the same category along with Lee Stanley, Philip Hurn, and Ken Schaefer for their work on Drug Watch L.A. and Drug Watch L.A. Second Edition. Drug Watch L.A. Second Edition was the winner awarding Shane his second Emmy Award.

In 1992, along with Lee Stanley, Shane was honored with a Christopher Award for A Time for Life where the filmmakers paired up three kids serving time in a maximum security prison for murder and three kids who were terminally ill from Los Angeles Children's Hospital.

In 1994, Shane was the recipient of two CINE Golden Eagle Awards both as producer and editor for his documentary Street Pirates. The film was also honored with the Silver Star at the WorldFest-Houston International Film Festival.

In 2005, Stanley's film A Sight for Sore Eyes was honored with the Gold Special Jury Award at WorldFest-Houston International Film Festival before winning three Prix Aurora Awards for writing, original screenplay and directing. The film was honored with two Telly Awards for writing and directing and won several renown international film festivals including the International Film Festival for best dramatic film.

In 2006, along with Lee Stanley, Dwayne Johnson, Xzibit, Sean Porter and Glenn Bell received Los Angeles County's Enriching Lives honors for the positive impact their work has had on society.

In 2008 A Sight for Sore Eyes was recognized by the International Family Film Festival for best drama.

In 2011, My Trip to the Dark Side was honored with a Gold Remi Award at Worldfest Houston.

In 2016, his film, The Untold Story starring Barry Van Dyke and Nia Peeples was the winner for Best Screenplay at The Breckenridge Film Festival, and nominated for Best Picture at Central Florida's Film Festival. To date, the film has been in over a dozen film festivals including Carmel, Garden State, and New York.

Filmography
 Night Train (2023) (producer) (director) (editor)   
 Double Threat (2022) (producer) (director) (editor) 
 Break Even (2020) (producer) (director) (editor)
 The Untold Story (2019) (producer) (writer) (director)
 Southern Decadence (2018) (director)
 Paloma's Flight (2018) (producer) (creator)
 Mistrust (2018) (producer) (writer) (director)
 My Trip Back to the Dark Side (2014) (producer) (writer) (director)
 Pleasure or Pain (2013) (producer)
 My Trip to the Dark Side (2011) (producer) (writer) (director)
 E! True Hollywood Story (Bret Michaels) (2009) (Himself)
 A Touch of Beijing (2008) (supervising producer) (editor)
 Starz Special: Gridiron Gang (2006) (TV) (Himself)
 Gridiron Gang (2006) (executive producer)
 A Sight for Sore Eyes (2005) (producer) (director) (editor)
 Whispers in the Wind (2005) (V) (producer) (director)
 A Touch of Greece (2004) (V) (supervising producer) (editor)
 Dream Chasers (2003) (TV) (producer) (editor)
 Destiny of Peace (2003) (V) (producer) (director)
 Carman: The Champion (2001) (editor)
 Held for Ransom (2000) (additional editor)
 Five Aces (1999) (associate producer)
 High Tension, Low Budget (The Making of a Letter from Death Row) (1999) (V) (producer)
 No Code of Conduct (1998) (co-producer) (writer) (editor) (stunt double, Mark Dacascos)
 Free Money (1998) (associate producer)
 A Letter from Death Row (1998) (producer: Los Angeles)
 Transitions (1998) (TV) (co-producer)
 In God's Hands (1998) (Third Rochar)
 Crime Defense (1997) (co-producer)
 Discovery Mars (1997) (V) (producer)
 Billboard Live in Concert: Bret Michaels (1997) (producer)
 The Messengers (1996) (editor)
 Entertainment Tonight (1995) (production staff) (editorial)
 Clear and Present Danger (1994) (production assistant)
 Seinfeld (1994) (production staff)
 The Second Half (1994) (production staff)
 Coach TV Series (1994) (production staff)
 All American Girl (1994 TV series) (1994) (production staff)
 Blue Chicago Blues (1994) (sound) (actor)
 Street Pirates (1994) (producer) (editor)
 Good Cop, Bad Kid (1993) (TV) (associate producer) (sound)
 Gridiron Gang (1993) (TV) (co-producer) (second unit director)
 Red Shoe Diaries (1992) TV series (writer, unknown episodes)
 Drug Watch L.A. - 2nd. Edition (1992) (TV) (co-producer) (camera)
 A Step Apart (1992) (TV) (co-producer) (composer, "A Second Chance")
 Drug Watch L.A. (1991) (TV) (co-producer)
 A Time for Life (1991) (TV) (producer) (story by)
 Father/Son (1990) (co-producer)
 Maiden Voyage (1989) (TV) (co-producer)
 To Your Health (1988) (V) (producer) (editor)
 Desperate Passage (1987) (co-producer) (camera)
 Mountain Tops (1981) (Kid in Park)
 Off the Wall (1979) (Young racquet ball player)
 Whitney and the Robot (1979) TV series (Ryan)
 Safety, Check Your Car (1977) Passenger
 Motorcycle Experience (1976) (Mini Bike Rider)
 Walk Safe, Young America (1975) (Tommy)
 Bicycle Safety (1975) (Young BMX Rider)
 On the Line (1971) (Himself)

External links

References

1971 births
People from Encino, Los Angeles
Living people
American film producers